Candida mogii is a species of yeast in the genus Candida. It is present, fuchu miso  use in the production of xylitol .

References

mogii
Fungi described in 1967